is a Japanese footballer currently playing as a midfielder for Ococias Kyoto.

Career statistics

Club
.

Notes

References

External links

1989 births
Living people
Japanese footballers
Association football midfielders
Japan Football League players
J3 League players
Japan Soccer College players
SP Kyoto FC players
ReinMeer Aomori players
Vanraure Hachinohe players
Ococias Kyoto AC players